The 1965–66 season was the 86th season of competitive football in England.

Diary of the season

7 October 1965: An experiment to broadcast a live game to another ground takes place. Cardiff City play Coventry City and the match is broadcast to a crowd of 10,000 at Coventry's ground Highfield Road.

11 December 1965: Victory for Liverpool over Arsenal sees the Kopites open up a three-point gap over Burnley in second at the top of the Football League, while West Bromwich Albion – formerly in third – slide down the table after Leeds United hit them for four. Leeds are not the only beneficiaries of WBA's defeat: Tottenham Hotspur's London derby win over Chelsea and Sheffield United's point against Nottingham Forest are enough for both to go above the Albion. Leeds, Tottenham, and Sheffield United have all gained 25 points, though the South Yorkshire side have played one more match than the other two. In the third tier, Walsall forward George Kirby is attacked by pitch-invading Millwall supporters.

12 February 1966: Division Three table-toppers Hull City beat top-flight Nottingham Forest at Boothferry Park in the FA Cup fourth round.
 
20 March 1966: The Jules Rimet Trophy, prize for winning the FIFA World Cup, is stolen from an exhibition at Central Hall, Westminster, where it was on show in the run-up to this summer's World Cup in England.

27 March 1966: The World Cup is recovered by Pickles, a mongrel dog, in South London.

16 April 1966: Liverpool seal the First Division title for the seventh time in their history with a 2–0 home win over Stoke City.

5 May 1966: Liverpool are beaten 2–1 (a.e.t.) by West German side Borussia Dortmund in the 1966 final of the European Cup Winners' Cup at Hampden Park, Glasgow, Scotland.

14 May 1966: Everton win the FA Cup with a 3–2 win over Sheffield Wednesday in the final at Wembley Stadium, despite going 2–0 down in the 57th minute.

11 July 1966: England, as the host nation, begin their World Cup campaign with a goalless draw against Uruguay at Wembley Stadium.

16 July 1966: England's World Cup campaign continues with a 2–0 win over Mexico (goals coming from Bobby Charlton and Roger Hunt) that moves them closes to qualifying for the next stage of the competition.

20 July 1966: England qualify for the next stage of the World Cup with a 2–0 win over France in their final group game. Roger Hunt scores both of England's goals.

23 July 1966: England beat Argentina 1–0 in the World Cup quarter-final thanks to a goal by Geoff Hurst.

26 July 1966: England reach the World Cup final by beating Portugal 2–1 in the semi-final. Bobby Charlton scores both of England's goals.

30 July 1966: England win the World Cup with a 4–2 win over West Germany in extra time. Geoff Hurst scores a hat-trick, with Martin Peters scoring the other goal.

Honours
{| class="wikitable"
|-
!style="width:15em"|Competition!!style="width:15em"|Winner!!style="width:15em"|Runner-up
|-
|First Division||Liverpool (7*)||Leeds United
|-
|Second Division||Manchester City||Southampton
|-
|Third Division||Hull City||Millwall
|-
|Fourth Division||Doncaster Rovers||Darlington
|-
|FA Cup||Everton (3)||Sheffield Wednesday
|-
|League Cup||West Bromwich Albion (1)||West Ham United
|-
|Charity Shield||colspan=2|Manchester United and Liverpool (shared)
|-
|Home Championship||||

Notes = Number in parentheses is the times that club has won that honour. * indicates new record for competition

Football League

First Division
Liverpool, FA Cup winners the previous season and league champions in 1964, won the First Division title with a six-point gap over last season's runners-up Leeds United, who finished level on points with Burnley. Manchester United, who also reached the semi-finals of the European Cup, ended their defence of the league title with a fourth-place finish. Chelsea finished fifth to maintain their standing as one of the First Division's top club sides. West Bromwich Albion finished sixth and won the League Cup.

11th placed Everton compensated for a disappointing league campaign by winning the FA Cup for the first time in the postwar era.

12th placed West Ham United perhaps had the biggest influence on the English game in 1966, with England's World Cup winning team featuring captain Bobby Moore and goalscorers Geoff Hurst and Martin Peters.

Blackburn Rovers went down in bottom place, a woeful 15 points adrift of safety. Northampton Town's brave first (and to date, only) season among the elite ended in relegation.

Second Division
Manchester City's three-year exile from the top flight ended in promotion as Second Division champions, and they were joined in promotion by runners-up Southampton, who had never played in the First Division before. Coventry City missed out on a First Division debut by a single point, while Bristol City came just three points short of reclaiming the First Division place which had last been theirs in 1911.

Leyton Orient and Middlesbrough were relegated to the Third Division.

Third Division
Champions Hull City and runners-up Millwall made the step upwards from the Third Division to the Second.

York City, Brentford, Exeter City and Southend United were relegated to the Fourth Division.

Fourth Division
Doncaster Rovers enjoyed some much-overdue success by clinching the Fourth Division title and a place in the Third Division. Also promoted were Darlington, Torquay United and Colchester United. Bradford City had to apply for re-election to the league for the second time in four seasons - loss of their league place would have made them the first former winners of a major trophy to be voted out of the Football League.

Top goalscorers

First Division
Willie Irvine (Burnley) – 29 goals

Second Division
Martin Chivers (Southampton) – 30 goals

Third Division
Les Allen (Queens Park Rangers) – 30 goals

Fourth Division
Kevin Hector (Bradford Park Avenue) – 44 goals

References